Tirumalairayanpattinam is a census town and commune in the Karaikal District of Puducherry, India. Tirumalairayanpattinam is situated at a distance of 6 kilometres to the south of Karaikal municipality.

Etymology

Thirumalairayanpattinam belongs to Karaikal District in Puducherry. This town is believed to be named after the king who ruled TR Pattinam during ancient days and also the river named out of that king name Tirumalarajanar River which drains into the Bay of Bengal a few kilometres north of the town.

Demography 
According to the 2001 census, Thirumalarajanpattinam had a population of 18,862 with 9,289 men and 9,573 women. The sex ratio was 1.031:1.

Masi Magam 
This annual festival takes place on the full moon day of the Tamil month of Masi (Between February and March). Deities from as many temples in and around Karaikal are brought in ceremonial processions to the seashore for a symbolic immersion ceremony. Thousands of people go to the seashore to have a dip in the sea which is said to wash away one's sins. The most important deity, which takes part in the festival, is Sowriraja Perumal of Thirukannapuram village in Tamil Nadu area. The saying goes that Sowriraja Perumal married a fishermen community woman and hence the moment the deity enters Tirumalairayan-pattinam village of Tirumalairayanpattinam commune for the festival, the fishermen take charge of the deity and charges are replaced after the festival is completed i.e. after the holy bath. This festival is held with all pomp and glory although it cannot be compared to the degree of celebration in Pondicherry.

Educational institutions
Govt. Schools 
 Govt. Middle School, Senior theru, T.R. Pattinam
 Govt. Primary School, Abirami East St., T.R. Pattinam
 Govt. Higher Secondary School, T.R. Pattinam
 Govt. Girls High School, T.R. Pattinam
 Govt. Middle School, T.R. Pattinam
 Govt. Primary School, Melaiyur Junction, T.R. Pattinam
 Govt. Men ITI, T.R. Pattinam
 Govt. Women ITI, T.R. Pattinam
 Govt. Primary School, Garudapalayam, T.R. Pattinam
 Govt. Primary School, Vadakattali, T.R. Pattinam
 Govt. Primary School, Pattinacherry, T.R. Pattinam
 Govt. primary School, Mariamman Koil Pet, T.R. Pattinam
 Govt. Primary School, North Vanjore, T.R. Pattinam
 Govt. Primary School, Polagam, T.R. Pattinam
 Govt. Middle School, Ellaiamman Koil St., T.R. Pattinam

PRIVATE SCHOOLS   
 Immaculate English High School, Eda theru, T.R. Pattinam
 Vinith Primary School, Peria Maricar St., T.R. Pattinam
 Bright Future Primary School, Pandagasalai St., T.R. Pattinam
 Vengadeswar School, Gandhi Salai, T.R. Pattinam
 Abirami Play School, Nagavarna Pillaiyar Koil St., T.R. Pattinam
 New Star, Big Street, T.R. Pattinam
sri arobindo primary school, T.R. Pattinam

Economy 
T.R pattinam is located in the industrial zone. List of company 

 Karaikal Port
 Kothari Sugars & Chemicals Ltd., Karaikal
 Kothari Petro Chemical Ltd., Nagore Salai, Karaikal
 Chemplast Sanmar Pvt Ltd., Polagam, Karaikal
 Elango Steel Ltd., Polagam, Karaikal
 Kannappan Steel Ltd., Nagore Salai Vanjure, Karaikal
 Rengaraj Steel Ltd., Nagore Salai Vanjure, Karaikal
 MMS Steel Ltd., Nagore Salai Vanjure, Karaikal
 Motorola Steel Ltd., Nagore Salai Vanjure, Karaikal
 PSP Steel Ltd., Keezhavanjure, Karaikal
 Padma Balaji Steel Ltd., Keezhavanjure, Karaikal
 Midas Rubberf Ltd., Nagore Salai Vanjure, Karaikal
 Kiran Pondy Chemicals Ltd., Nagore Salai Vanjure,  Karaikal
 Praveen Chemicals Ltd., (Power Soap), Keezhavanjure, Karaikal
 Vani Soap Company, Nagore Salai Vanjure, Karaikal
 Vasantha Carnite Ltd., Nagore Salai Vanjure, Karaikal
 AVM Battery Ltd., Mudalimedu, Polagam Karaikal
 Mahalakshmi Garments, Nagore Salai Vanjure, Karaikal
 VPS Polythine Ltd., Keezhavanjure. Karaikal
 Lakshmi Polythine Ltd., Medalimedu, Karaikal
 Jothi Chloride Ltd., Polagam, Karaikal
 Commando Soap Company, Polagam, Karaikal
 Raja Oil Mill, Nagore Salai Vanjure, Karaikal
 Varahini chems salai, kKaraikal
 Hotel Buhari, Gandhi main road, Nearvy

Railway station 
Tirumalairayanpattinam railway station address: Tirumalairayan Pattinam, Puducherry 609606, India

See also 

 Neravy T R Pattinam (Union Territory Assembly constituency)

Current and past MLAs from Neravy Tr Pattinam Assembly Constituency

References 

 

Cities and towns in Karaikal district